Revenge of the Nerds is a 1984 American comedy film directed by Jeff Kanew and starring Robert Carradine, Anthony Edwards, Ted McGinley, and Bernie Casey.  The film's plot chronicles a group of nerds at the fictional Adams College trying to stop the ongoing harassment by the jock fraternity, the Alpha Betas, in addition to the latter's sister sorority, Pi Delta Pi.

Plot
Best friends and nerds Lewis Skolnick and Gilbert Lowe enroll in Adams College to study computer science. The Alpha Betas, a fraternity that includes most of the Adams football team, carelessly burn down their own house and, urged by Coach Harris, take over the freshman dorms, literally throwing the freshmen out into the street. Dean Ulich designates temporary living space in the gymnasium and allows the freshmen to rush the fraternities. Lewis, Gilbert, and several other nerds fail to join fraternities, but are able to secure a dilapidated house near campus and repair it as a residence.

The Alpha Betas, led by star quarterback Stan Gable, are irked by the nerds' success, and Stan sets his fellow members to pull pranks against the nerds, which includes throwing a rock through the window saying "Nerds, get out". The nerds try to get campus police to help, but the campus cops are constrained by the Greek Council that adjudicates all such pranks, of which Stan is currently president. The nerds decide to seek membership on the Greek Council by joining a national fraternity. After 29 rejection letters, the only one that considers them is the black fraternity Lambda Lambda Lambda (Tri-Lambs), led by U.N. Jefferson. As only one of the nerds is black, Jefferson is about to disapprove when Poindexter sees in the fine print that all applicants are given probationary membership. The nerds set up a large party with the Omega Mu sorority, similarly made up of nerds, including Gilbert's girlfriend Judy, and invite Jefferson to attend. The party is dull until Booger provides them with high quality marijuana. The Alpha Betas and the Pi Delta Pis, the sorority to which Stan's girlfriend Betty Childs belongs, then disrupt the party by bringing and releasing pigs. Enraged, the nerds exact revenge on both groups by pulling similar pranks. Impressed with the nerds' tenacity, Jefferson grants them full membership.

However, the harassment intensifies and Stan Gable stonewalls any attempts by the Greek Council to sanction Alpha Beta. The nerds realize the only way to get the Council to help is to put one of their own in as president, which they can do by winning the Greek Games during homecoming. Partnering with the Omega Mus and using their extensive knowledge, the Tri-Lambs compete strongly with the Alpha Betas/Pi Delta Pis during the athletic events. At the charity fundraiser, the nerds heavily outsell the Alpha Betas by offering pies with naked pictures of Betty and other Pi Delta Pis on the bottom. During this, Lewis, who has fallen in love with Betty, steals Stan's costume and  tricks Betty into engaging in sexual intercourse with him. Though surprised when Lewis reveals his identity, she admits he was "wonderful". Finally, the nerds dominate the musical competition with a techno-computer-driven musical production, winning the overall games. Lewis immediately nominates Gilbert as the new Council president.

Coach Harris lambastes the Alpha Betas for losing to the nerds, and Stan leads them in vandalizing the Tri-Lamb house. The nerds become despondent, and Gilbert decides to barge into the middle of the Homecoming Pep Rally to address his complaints. The Alpha Betas try to stop him, but Jefferson and a group of national Tri-Lambs arrive to intimidate the Alpha Betas, giving Gilbert the opportunity to give a rousing speech about standing up to discrimination. Lewis and the other Tri-Lambs, many alumni, and Betty, who announces she is "in love with a nerd", join in cheering Gilbert, soundly shaming the Alpha Betas. An emboldened Dean Ulich instructs Coach Harris that the Tri-Lambs will now live in the Alpha Beta house, while the Alpha Betas will live in the gym until they can repair the Tri-Lamb house.

Cast
 Robert Carradine as Lewis Skolnick
 Anthony Edwards as Gilbert Lowe
 Ted McGinley as Stanley Harvey "Stan" Gable
 Julie Montgomery as Betty Childs
 Timothy Busfield as Arnold Poindexter
 Andrew Cassese as Harold Wormser
 Curtis Armstrong as Dudley "Booger" Dawson
 Larry B. Scott as Lamar Latrelle
 Brian Tochi as Toshiro Takashi
 Michelle Meyrink as Judy
 Matt Salinger as Danny Burke
 Donald Gibb as Frederick Aloysius "Ogre" Palowaski
 James Cromwell as Mr. Skolnick
 David Wohl as Dean Ulich
 John Goodman as Coach Harris
 Bernie Casey as U.N. Jefferson
 Alice Hirson as Mrs. Lowe
 Lisa Welch as Suzy

Script and casting
The movie was inspired by a Los Angeles magazine article, titled "Revenge of the Nerds", that described computer programmers gaining respect in Silicon Valley. 

Director Jeff Kanew saw Ted McGinley on the cover of a "Men of USC" calendar and decided he was perfect for the role of the head of the Alpha Beta fraternity. Kanew cast Matt Salinger as another Alpha Beta brother because he loved his father's book Catcher in the Rye so much. 

A scene of a Tri-Lambda convention in Las Vegas did not make it into the final movie because a 20th Century Fox executive thought it was making fun of him.

Production
The University of Arizona in Tucson, Arizona, was chosen to film many of the exterior scenes. Bill J. Varney, the university's assistant vice president for administrative services, approved filming, particularly after 20th Century Fox agreed to make a large donation to the university. Two weeks later, the university's administrators revoked permission to film on campus. Dudley B. Woodard, university vice president for student affairs, said the movie would not "portray campus life in a representative way". Allan Beigel, vice president of university relations, said there was nothing that would make them change their minds. 

After some negotiations, the university decided to allow filming on campus after all as long as the producers tried to schedule film shooting so as to not affect campus activities, not film anything "with a questionable nature with regards to taste", and accept advice from fraternities. Film shooting on campus began in January 1984. 

The Nerds' original residence, from which they were ousted by the Alpha Betas, was actually Cochise Hall. Their subsequent residence was University of Arizona's Bear Down Gymnasium. The original Alpha Beta fraternity house that is burned down was filmed at the Alpha Gamma Rho fraternity house (on University Boulevard), which at the time was the Alpha Gamma Rho house. 

Casting for extras, specifically for mean jocks, sorority sisters, and members of a black fraternity, was held at the University of Arizona's Drama Building and at a Tuscon Hilton Inn.

While working as a security guard during filming, an off-duty police officer found a vial with a small amount of cocaine in a dressing room. The police decided not to pursue an investigation because it would be impossible to determine whose it was.

Interior scenes were shot at Old Tucson Studios.

Different sources report the film's budget as anywhere from $6million to $8million, though even $8million was a low budget for a feature film of the time.

Soundtrack

Ollie E. Brown, of Ollie & Jerry fame, wrote and performed the song "They're So Incredible" for the film, under the name Revenge. In the film, the song is performed by the Tri-Lambs at the final event of the Greek Games and contains different lyrics.

Three songs appear in the film but do not appear on the soundtrack: "Burning Down the House" by Talking Heads, "Thriller" by Michael Jackson, and "We Are the Champions" by Queen.

Reception

Critical response
Revenge of the Nerds was panned by many reviewers at release. Lawrence van Gelder for The New York Times wrote, "It is the absence of genuine comedy that exposes glaringly the film's fundamental attitude of condescension and scorn toward blacks and women, and a tendency toward stereotyping that clashes violently with its superficial message of tolerance, compassion and fair play." The Hollywood Reporter said "Revenge of the Nerds is primarily the story of outcasts getting their just rewards, and that is always a satisfying movie ingredient. Nonetheless, this scattergun, often scatological film is filled with extensive racial stereotypes, which may offend some moviegoers." The Atlanta Constitution said that Lewis' pursuit of a cheerleader "goes beyond being pathetic and becomes masochistic". Newsday called it "another predictable and witless teenage sex comedy". 

On the other hand, Kevin Thomas of The Los Angeles Times thoroughly enjoyed the movie, calling it "a delicious, gratifying underdog fantasy and a raunchy, uproarious satire set in the often cruel and inherently discriminating world of college fraternities and sororities."

Box office
Revenge of the Nerds was released in theaters on July 20, 1984, although some theaters showed the movie a few days early as a preview.

The film grossed $40million domestically.

Home media
The film was released on DVD on March 6, 2007, and on Blu-ray on May 6, 2014, by 20th Century Fox Home Entertainment.

Legacy

Lasting reception
The film holds a 71% critics' approval rating film review aggregator website Rotten Tomatoes, based on 43 critics' reviews. Their consensus reads: "Undeniably lowbrow but surprisingly sly, Revenge of the Nerds has enough big laughs to qualify as a minor classic in the slobs-vs.-snobs subgenre". 

On Metacritic, it has a score of 44 out of 100, based on reviews from six critics, indicating "mixed or average reviews". 

Revenge of the Nerds is #91 on Bravo's "100 Funniest Movies".

Fraternity
Due to the influence of the film, a genuine Lambda Lambda Lambda fraternity was founded at the University of Connecticut in 2006, and several chapters have sprung up in different locations around the United States. The "Tri-Lambs" (not an all-black fraternity as portrayed in the film, but open to all races and orientations) currently has six chapters in Connecticut, Maryland, New York, and Washington state.

Controversy
About three decades after the film's release, commentators have looked back at the film and considered some of the scenes, particularly when Lewis pretends to be Stan and has a sexual encounter with Betty, to be rape by deception and a misogynistic remnant of a male-dominated culture of that time. William Bradley of The Mary Sue stated that after viewing the film again as an adult he "was immediately struck by the way the film plays sexual exploitation and assault for laughs". Amy Benfer of Salon wrote that the Revenge of the Nerds scene, and a similar scene in John Hughes' Sixteen Candles, were evidence that at the time of these films' productions, "people were stupid about date rape". In an interview with GQ in 2019, director Jeff Kanew and writer Steve Zacharias expressed their regret regarding the rape by deception scene, with Kanew saying, "In a way, it's not excusable. If it were my daughter, I probably wouldn't like it".

Sequels
Three less successful sequels followed; the last two were television films.
 Revenge of the Nerds II: Nerds in Paradise (1987)
 Revenge of the Nerds III: The Next Generation (1992)
 Revenge of the Nerds IV: Nerds in Love (1994)

Planned remake
A remake of the original Revenge of the Nerds was slated for release in 2007, the first project for the newly created Fox Atomic, but was canceled in November 2006 after two weeks of filming. The cast included Adam Brody, Dan Byrd, Katie Cassidy, Kristin Cavallari, Jenna Dewan, Chris Marquette, Ryan Pinkston, Efren Ramirez, and Nick Zano. The film was to be directed by Kyle Newman, executive produced by McG, and written by Gabe Sachs and Jeff Judah, Adam Jay Epstein and Andrew Jacobson, and Adam F. Goldberg.

Filming took place in Atlanta, Georgia at Agnes Scott College, the Georgia State Capitol, and Inman Park. Filming was originally scheduled to take place at Emory University, but university officials changed their minds after reading the script. The film was shelved after producers found the movie difficult to shoot on the smaller Agnes Scott campus and studio head Peter Rice was disappointed with the dailies. 20th Century Fox personnel have stated that it is highly unlikely that a remake will be picked up in the future.

Seth MacFarlane announced his intentions to reboot the series under his Fuzzy Door Productions for 20th Century Studios in December 2020 with Kenny and Keith Lucas to write and star in the film.

Television
A pilot for a Revenge of the Nerds television series directed by Peter Baldwin was produced in 1991, but was never aired and was not picked up for a series. The aborted TV pilot was later included as a bonus in the DVD release of the film.

In the mid-2000s, Armstrong and Carradine had devised an idea for a reality television show based on nerds competing against each other in challenges, inspired by Revenge of the Nerds. However, the idea was rejected at the time, due to the competing Beauty and the Geek show. Six years later, Armstrong and Carradine shopped the idea around and were able to get the show greenlit on TBS in 2012. King of the Nerds ran for three seasons from 2013 to 2015, with Armstrong and Carradine hosting the program.

See also 
 Animal House

References

External links

 
 
 
 
 Revenge of the Nerds on Fast Rewind

 
1984 films
1980s sex comedy films
1980s teen comedy films
1980s buddy comedy films
American sex comedy films
American teen comedy films
American buddy comedy films
1980s English-language films
Films about fraternities and sororities
Films about pranks
Films about school bullying
Films shot in Tucson, Arizona
Films shot in Texas
Universities and colleges in art
University of Arizona
20th Century Fox films
Interscope Communications films
Films scored by Thomas Newman
Films directed by Jeff Kanew
Teen sex comedy films
1984 comedy films
1980s American films